This is a list of Grade B+ listed buildings in County Fermanagh, Northern Ireland.

In Northern Ireland, the term listed building refers to a building or other structure officially designated as being of "special architectural or historic interest". Grade B+ structures are those considered to be "buildings which might have merited grade A status but for detracting features such as an incomplete design, lower quality additions or alterations. Also included are buildings that because of exceptional features, interiors or environmental qualities are clearly above the general standard set by grade B buildings. A building may merit listing as grade B+ where its historic importance is greater than a similar building listed as grade B."

Listing began later in Northern Ireland than in the rest of the UK; the first provision for listing was contained in the Planning (Northern Ireland) Order 1972, and the current legislative basis for listing is the Planning (Northern Ireland) Order 1991. Under Article 42 of the Order, the Department of the Environment of the Northern Ireland Executive is required to compile lists of buildings of "special architectural or historic interest". The responsibility for the listing process rests with the Northern Ireland Environment Agency (NIEA), an executive agency within the Department of the Environment.

Following the introduction of listing, an initial survey of Northern Ireland's building stock was begun in 1974. By the time of the completion of this First Survey in 1994, the listing process had developed considerably, and it was therefore decided to embark upon a Second Survey to update and cross-check the original information. , the Second Survey had been completed for 147 of Northern Ireland's 547 council wards, and completion is anticipated by 2016. Information gathered during this survey, relating to both listed and unlisted buildings, is entered into the publicly accessible Northern Ireland Buildings Database. A range of listing criteria, which aim to define architectural and historic interest, have been developed by the NIEA, and are used to determine whether or not to list a building.

Once listed, severe restrictions are imposed on the modifications allowed to a building's structure or its fittings. Listed building consent must be obtained from local authorities prior to any alteration to such a structure. There are approximately 8,500 listed buildings in Northern Ireland, representing 2% of the total building stock. Of these, around 580 are listed at Grade B+.

The County has 34 Grade B+ listed buildings.

Listed buildings

|}

Notes

References

External links

Northern Ireland Buildings Database

 
 
Listed buildings Fermanagh
Grade B+ listed
Lists of listed buildings in Northern Ireland